Songbird Sings Streisand was a concert residency and tribute show by Filipina singer Regine Velasquez at the Onstage Theater in Makati. The residency began on November 14 and concluded on December 20, 2003, after completing twelve shows. The set list contained songs recorded by American singer-songwriter Barbra Streisand, who Velasquez described as an inspiration and influence. It featured Streisand's extensive catalogue in music, film, and theatre. The show was exclusively promoted by Maximedia International. Raul Mitra served as musical director for the production. Reviews for the show were generally positive, with critics praising Velasquez's prowess performing live.

Background and development
Regine Velasquez's music was influenced by foreign artists early in her career. She has been vocal of her admiration for American singer-songwriter Barbra Streisand, who she cites as her "musical inspiration" and "most revered idol". She has stated, "I’ve been singing [Streisand's] songs since I was 12 years old... but they are not easy to sing. They’re very difficult. The melodies are very complicated." Velasquez further said that she admires Streisand's "fearlessness" and "dedication to excellence". In the early 1990s, Velasquez first performed a Streisand tribute show at the Mandarin Oriental Manila's Captain's Bar which was staged for four nights.

On October 25, 2003, the Philippine Daily Inquirer announced that Velasquez would return to perform a Streisand tribute show at the Onstage Theater in Makati for six nights on all weekends of November. All the songs on the show were selected from Streisand's extensive catalogue in music, film and theatre. Velasquez described the process as a "daunting task" and added that she hoped to include a variety of genres from "classics" to "standards". Velasquez re-teamed with Raul Mitra as musical director after their collaborations in 2001's Regine at the Movies and  2002's Songbird Sings. A week after the last performance, Maximedia added six more dates in December, bringing the number to twelve shows.

Synopsis and reception
The concert began with Velasquez performing "As If We Never Said Goodbye". At the conclusion of the song, the curtains opened to reveal rows of musicians across the stage while she transitioned directly to Anyone Can Whistles theme "Everybody Says Don't". She then sat centerstage and sang a medley of "Comin' In and Out of Your Life", "Kiss Me in the Rain", and "My Heart Belongs to Me. For the next number, she did renditions of Streisand's collaborations with the Bee Gees: "Guilty" and "Woman in Love". The set list continued with songs from the soundtrack of Streisand's 1976 musical romance drama A Star Is Born. "Memory" and "Send In the Clowns" were performed afterwards, before she closed the segment with a medley of "With One Look" and "Somewhere".

The next segment started with the show tune "Don't Rain on My Parade" from the musical Funny Girl. Velasquez then sang "The Way We Were", before continuing with a medley of Streisand's duets, such as "You Don't Bring Me Flowers", "Till I Loved You", and "I Finally Found Someone". Shortly after, she stood next to the piano for a performance of "The Music of the Night" with Raul Mitra. This was followed by a Latin-oriented rendition of "No More Tears (Enough Is Enough)". Next, she sang the show title tune "Songbird". After singing excerpts from "Papa, Can You Hear Me?", Velasquez proceeded to perform the songs from the 1983 musical film Yentl. She closed the show with an encore performance of "People" and "On a Clear Day (You Can See Forever)".

The concerts were met with positive responses from critics, who praised the show's theme and Velasquez's vocal abilities. Boy Abunda from The Philippine Star called it a "musical extravaganza" and an "audio-visual feast". He continued to commend the show's music, saying, "[Velasquez] not only chose the popular signature hits... but she also included the more obscure selections". Abunda also described Velasquez as a "seasoned chanteuse" who "has mastered the fine art of belting". Meanwhile, the Philippine Daily Inquirers Nestor Torre Jr. wrote: "[Velasquez] empathizes both emotionally and vocally with Streisand's repertoire, and this musical chemistry makes for her especially personal renditions of [Streisand's] signature songs."

Set list
This set list is adapted from the television special Songbird Sings Streisand.

 "As If We Never Said Goodbye"
 "Everybody Says Don't"
 "Comin' In and Out of Your Life" / "Kiss Me in the Rain" / "My Heart Belongs to Me
 "Guilty"
 "Woman in Love"
 "Lost Inside of You" / "With One More Look at You" / "Evergreen"
 "Memory"
 "Send In the Clowns"
 "With One Look" / "Somewhere"
 "Don't Rain on My Parade"
 "The Way We Were"
 "You Don't Bring Me Flowers" / "Till I Loved You" / "I Finally Found Someone" / "All of My Life"
 "The Music of the Night"
 "No More Tears (Enough Is Enough)"
 "Songbird"
 "Papa, Can You Hear Me?"
 "The Way He Makes Me Feel" / "No Matter What Happens"
 "A Piece of Sky"
Encore
 "People"
 "On a Clear Day (You Can See Forever)"

Shows

See also
 List of Regine Velasquez live performances

Notes

References

External links
 Tours of Regine Velasquez at Live Nation

Regine Velasquez concert tours
2003 concert residencies
Barbra Streisand